Tice may refer to:

Geography
 Tice, Florida, United States, a census-designated place
 Tice, Illinois, United States, an unincorporated community
 Tice (wetlands), wetlands in Slovakia

People
 Austin Tice (born 1981), former U.S. Marine Corps officer and kidnapped freelance journalist
 Elena Tice (born 1997), English-born Irish cricketer
 George A. Tice (born 1938), American photographer
 John Tice (born 1960), American former National Football League player, brother of Mike Tice
 John H. Tice (1809–1883), an American weather forecaster, educator, and author
 Mike Tice (born 1959), American former National Football League player and head coach and current offensive line coach
 Patrick Tice (born 1994), Irish cricketer, brother of Elena Tice
 Richard Tice (born 1964), British property developer and CEO
 Rico Tice (born 1966), English Anglican clergyman and writer
 Robbie Tice (born 1990), Canadian soccer and futsal player
 Russ Tice (born 1961), American whistleblower and former intelligence analyst
 Ty Tice (born 1996), American baseball player

Other uses
 Tice Grammar School, Tice, Florida, on the National Register of Historic Places

See also 
 Tise, a Tibetan freeware utility
 Tise, Maharashtra, India, a village
 Theis (disambiguation)
 Tyce (disambiguation)